Mel Miller (born 14 October 1943) is a South African stand-up comedian and celebrity.

With friend Mel Green, Mel Miller began his career in 1963 as the comedy duo Mel and Mel. He also worked as a radio actor on the programmes Jet Jungle, The World of Hammond Innes, Marriage Lines and Squad Cars for Springbok Radio.

With the launch of television in South Africa in 1976, Miller became famous for his appearance in the comedy Biltong and Potroast. In addition, he has since appeared on The Everywhere Express, Us Animals and Punchline.

In 1985, Miller was arrested by the South African Security Police for his anti-government sentiment, and afterward withdrew from the limelight until being convinced to return to public performance by Joe Parker in 1990.

Miller appeared as one of the contestant panelists on the SABC2 game show Where Were You?, from August to November, 2008.

See also
 List of stand-up comedians

References 

South African male comedians
Living people
1943 births